First Taste is the twelfth studio album by American musician Ty Segall. It was released on August 2, 2019 under Drag City.

The first single from the album, "Taste" was released June 4, 2019. In support of the album, Segall and The Freedom Band announced a tour of the US through July to October 2019, and then a European tour after October.

Critical reception
First Taste was met with generally favorable reviews from critics. At Metacritic, which assigns a weighted average rating out of 100 to reviews from mainstream publications, this release received an average score of 79, based on 19 reviews

Accolades

Track listing

Charts

References

2019 albums
Ty Segall albums
Drag City (record label) albums